Warblington is a suburb of Havant, a town in Hampshire, England. Warblington used to be a civil parish, and before that was part of the Hundred of Bosmere.

Etymology
In Saxon times  there was a farm (OE: ) possibly owned by a woman called OE:  who gave her name to the village.  There are some alternatives eg: 'the farm (OE: ) of '.

The current Warblington Castle Farm occupies the approximate site of the original farm.

History

Pre-Roman

In prehistoric and early historical times the River Ems was tidal as far as Westbourne and the Westbrook creek reached to Victoria Road, leaving Emsworth almost isolated at high tide. A coastal route developed that led from Hayling Island through Havant and Rowlands Castle to the South Downs. A part of the coastal route followed the Portsdown ridgeway and from Chichester to Belmont Hill in Bedhampton probably skirted the heads of the various creeks which entered the harbour, passing through country still covered with the original thick forest of oak and beech.

Roman

In Roman times a villa existed to the south of the road to Noviomagus Reginorum in the fields of what is now Warblington Castle Farm. Archaeological finds show that the building was a sizeable brick and stone edifice, with floors paved with red brick and coloured sandstone and a view of the harbour and wooded shores of Hayling Island. The fertile landscape suggests the area to have been under continuous cultivation for 1500-1800 years.

Anglo-Saxon

In the 7th century  was absorbed into the Kingdom of Wessex and Saint Birinius converted Wessex to Christianity. In Warblington the Anglo-Saxons constructed a church where they could worship. The current St Thomas à Becket Church, Warblington occupies the same site as the old church and still retains some elements of the old structure.

Charters were granted by Kings Æthelstan and Æthelred in AD 935  and 980 establishing and confirming boundaries of Warblington. From AD 980-1066  the manor was held by Godwin, Earl of Wessex and his son Harold Godwinson.

Medieval

After the Norman Conquest, the Manor of Warblington was given to Roger de Montgomery, Earl of Shrewsbury as part of the manor of Westbourne. The Domesday Book lists the latter with two churches (one of the churches was actually at Westbourne), a mill, 29 families and two slaves (about 120 people). There were also seven plough teams, indicating about 850 acres of land under cultivation.

In the 1400s, the people were removed and the area became a private deer park for Richard Neville, 16th Earl of Warwick who then owned the manor.

The village was the site of a medieval manor, now known as Warblington Castle built in 1515 and 1525 and mostly destroyed in 1644 in the English Civil War leaving only a single gate tower, part of a wall, and a gateway.

Modern

The Imperial Gazetteer of 1870-1872 described Warblington as having a population of 2,196 as of 1861 and mentioned that the "church is Saxon".

The parish church of St Thomas à Becket is part of a joint parish with the church of St James, Emsworth. The oldest part of the church is the small central tower, which is Saxon and was built in the 11th century. In 1967 Pevsner and Lloyd described St Thomas à Becket church as essentially late 12th century and notes the "undisturbed" setting. To the north of the church is the locality's most distinctive landmark: the tall octagonal turret of Warblington Castle. In October 1551, Mary of Guise the widow of James V of Scotland stayed a night in Warblington manor as a guest of Sir Richard Cotton.

A cemetery, the ruins of Grade II listed Warblington Castle, on private property, the Grade I Listed St Thomas à Becket Church, Warblington a Grade II listed Old Farmhouse, and the Grade II listed Old Rectory are all within the boundaries of the Warblington Conservation Area.

Warblington contains a large secondary school (Warblington School) but no primary school.

Warblington railway station is on the West Coastway line.

Green Pond Corner used to be the local pond. The "corner group" also included Warblington House and Warblington Farm according to records from 1870. The pond was covered over around 1920 and now hosts the One Stop corner shop and local glass and fabric recycling point.

Notable residents
Sir Peter James Blake KBE (1 October 1948 – 5 December 2001), Sailor, buried in Warblington cemetery
John Brown (1820 – unknown), cricketer born in Warblington
George Carter (1846 – unknown), cricketer
James Norris, President of Corpus Christi College, Oxford 1843–72

Notes

References

Bibliography

Gallery

Havant
Villages in Hampshire